Wengwald is a request stop railway station in the municipality of Lauterbrunnen in the Swiss canton of Bern. The station is on the Wengernalpbahn (WAB), whose trains operate from Lauterbrunnen to Kleine Scheidegg via Wengen.

The station is located on the new line from Lauterbrunnen to Wengen, which opened in 1910 to replace the more direct but steeper original routing. It is immediately uphill of a 180 degree helical tunnel which the line uses in order to reduce the gradient.

The station is served by the following passenger trains:

References

External links 
 

Railway stations in the canton of Bern
Railway stations in Switzerland opened in 1910